The 1st Society of Texas Film Critics Awards were given by the Society of Texas Film Critics (STFC) on December 17, 1994. The list of winners was announced by STFC founder Michael MacCambridge, then also a film critic for the Austin American-Statesman. Founded in 1994, the Society of Texas Film Critics members included 21 film critics working for print and broadcast outlets across the state of Texas. The society's first meeting was held in the Representative Boardroom at the Omni Austin Hotel. Pulp Fiction took the top honor and a total of four awards, more than any other film, in this initial awards presentation.

Winners
 Best Film:
 Pulp Fiction 
 Best Director:
 Quentin Tarantino – Pulp Fiction 
 Best Actor:
 Samuel L. Jackson – Pulp Fiction 
 Best Actress:
 Linda Fiorentino – The Last Seduction
 Best Supporting Actor:
 Martin Landau – Ed Wood
 Best Supporting Actress:
 Dianne Wiest – Bullets over Broadway
 Best Screenplay:
 Quentin Tarantino and Roger Avary – Pulp Fiction
 Best Documentary Film:
 Hoop Dreams
 The Lone Star Award, recognizing the best Texas film of the year:
 Reality Bites

References

1994
1994 film awards
1994 in Texas